William, Billy or Bill Grey may refer to:

Public figures 
William Grey, 13th Baron Grey de Wilton (died 1562), English baron and military commander
William Grey, 1st Baron Grey of Werke (died 1674)  
William Grey (died 1551), MP for Reading
Willam Grey (died 1574), MP for Bridgnorth
Sir William Grey (governor) (1818–1878), Governor of Bengal 1866–1871, Governor of Jamaica 1874–1877
William Grey, 1st Baron Grey of Werke (died 1674), English politician
William Henry Grey (1829–1888), African-American storeowner, church leader, and Reconstruction politician in Arkansas
William Grey, 9th Earl of Stamford (1850–1910), English peer
William G. Gray (1913–1992), English ceremonial magician

Clergy 
William Grey (bishop of Lincoln) (died 1436), also bishop of London
William Grey (bishop of Ely) (died 1478), medieval English churchman

Characters 
Billy Grey, a character in Grand Theft Auto: The Lost and Damned
Bill Grey, fictional character in the Starfox series

See also

William Gray (disambiguation)
William Grey Walter (1910–1977), neurophysiologist